Uleila del Campo is a municipality of Almería province, in the autonomous community of Andalusia, Spain.

The village also has 8 bars, a pharmacy, a municipal Swimming Pool and a local fiesta, Which takes place every year on the second Saturday of September, to celebrate the religious figure, Nuestra Señora de Monteagud. ADSL Internet access in the village has been available since October 2006.

Demographics

References

External links
  Uleila del Campo - Sistema de Información Multiterritorial de Andalucía
  Uleila del Campo - Diputación Provincial de Almería
  Search Uleila del Campo - Description, information and photographs of Uleila del Campo, Almeria

Municipalities in the Province of Almería